Home star refers to:
 HOME STAR, a proposed federal program in the United States that would provide direct incentives to homeowners who invest in improving the energy efficiency of their homes.
 Homestar, a character in Homestar Runner.